

Götz Freiherr von Mirbach (12 September 1915 – 6 August 1968) was a naval captain with the Kriegsmarine during World War II. He was a recipient of the Knight's Cross of the Iron Cross with Oak Leaves of Nazi Germany.

Mirbach was assigned to the 1. Schnellbootflottille attacking enemy shipping in the English Channel, sinking a British destroyer and three armed merchant vessels among others.

He was later promoted to Korvettenkapitän and served as commander of the  9. Schnellbootflottille; taking part in the attack on Exercise Tiger on 28–29 April 1944.

Mirbach participated in the 1952 Summer Olympics in Helsinki, Finland. He was a member of the German 6 metre class sailing crew which finished in tenth place.

Awards
 Iron Cross (1939) 2nd Class (30 April 1940) & 1st Class (28 May 1940)
 Service Award (Dienstauszeichnung) 4th Class (5 April 1939)
 German Cross in Gold on 10 November 1942 as Kapitänleutnant on S-48 in the 4. Schnellbootflottille
 Knight's Cross of the Iron Cross with Oak Leaves
 Knight's Cross on 14 August 1940 as Oberleutnant zur See and commander of Schnellboot S-21 in the 1. Schnellbootflottille
 Oak Leaves on 14 June 1944 as Kapitänleutnant and chief of the 9. Schnellbootflottille
 Fast Attack Craft War Badge with Diamonds (14 June 1944)

References

Citations

Bibliography

 
 
 
 

1915 births
1968 deaths
People from Charlottenburg
Barons of Germany
Kriegsmarine personnel
Recipients of the Gold German Cross
Recipients of the Knight's Cross of the Iron Cross with Oak Leaves
German male sailors (sport)
Olympic sailors of Germany
Sailors at the 1952 Summer Olympics – 6 Metre
People from the Province of Brandenburg
Military personnel from Berlin